Pete Christlieb (born February 16, 1945) is an American jazz bebop, West Coast jazz and hard bop tenor saxophonist.

Biography
Christlieb was born in Los Angeles, California, United States, and is the son of bassoonist Don Christlieb. Christlieb has worked with many musicians, such as Louie Bellson, Chet Baker, Woody Herman, Count Basie, Tom Waits, Steely Dan, Warne Marsh, Doc Severinsen, The Tonight Show Band, Bob Florence, Frank Mantooth, Gary Urwin, Phil Kelly, and Bill Holman.

Christlieb played the sax solos on Steely Dan's hit song "Deacon Blues" from the album Aja; Natalie Cole's Grammy award-winning album Unforgettable; and the extended tenor sax solo on the song "FM (No Static at All)" from the movie of the same name.

Christlieb currently plays with his recently formed 11-piece group, the "Tall & Small Band"; the Bill Holman Orchestra; and his own quartet. Also, for years Christlieb has been involved in professional drag racing, with his cars participating in numerous races in the southwest and across the country. His team has won two national championships for the 'Blown Alcohol Dragster' class.

Christlieb played a jazz musician in the Star Trek: Deep Space Nine episode "His Way".

Discography

As leader or co-leader
 Jazz City: A Quartet with Pete Christlieb (RAHMP, 1971)
 Apogee (with Warne Marsh) (Warner Bros., 1978)
 Self Portrait (Bosco, 1981)
 Going My Way (Bosco, 1982)
 Dino's '83 (Bosco, 1983)
 Mosaic (with Bob Cooper) (Capri, 1990)
 Conversations with Warne Volume 1 (with Warne Marsh) (Criss Cross, 1990)
 Conversations with Warne Volume 2 (with Warne Marsh) (Criss Cross, 1995)
 Get Happy – Don Lanphere & Pete Christlieb with New Stories (Origin, 1996)
 The Tenor Trio – Ernie Watts/Pete Christlieb/Rickey Woodard (JMI/JVC, 1997)
 Red Kelly's Heroes (with the Bill Ramsay/Milt Kleeb Band) (CARS, 1997)
 Live At Capozzoli's (Las Vegas Late Night Sessions) – Pete Christlieb/Andy Martin Quintet (Woofy, 1998)
 For Heaven's Sake (CARS, 1999)
 Late Night Jazz – Pete Christlieb & Slyde Hyde (Vertical Jazz/Fine Tune, 2000)
 Live at the Jazz Cave (Cognito, 2006)
 Reunion – Hadley Caliman & Pete Christlieb (Origin, 2010)
 High On U – Tall & Small: The Pete Christlieb & Linda Small Eleven-Piece Band (Bosco, 2011)

With Doc Severinsen
 The Tonight Show Band with Doc Severinsen (Amherst, 1986)
 The Tonight Show Band with Doc Severinsen, Vol. II (Amherst, 1988)
 Once More...With Feeling! (Amherst, 1991)
 Merry Christmas From Doc Severinsen & the Tonight Show Orchestra (Amherst, 1991)

As sideman or guest
With Louie Bellson
 1974 150 MPH – Louie Bellson Big Band
 1975 The Louis Bellson Explosion
 1976 Live at Concord Summer Festival – Louie Bellson's 7
 1977 Prime Time
 1978 Sunshine Rock – Louie Bellson & The Explosion Orchestra
 1978 Matterhorn: Louie Bellson Drum Explosion
 1979 Louis Bellson Jam
 1984 Don't Stop Now!
 1996 Their Time Was the Greatest – Louie Bellson Honors 12 Super-Drummers
 1997 Air Bellson – Louie Bellson's Magic 7
 1998 The Art of the Chart – Louie Bellson's Big Band Explosion!

With Wayne Bergeron
 2002 You Call This a Living? 
 2007 Plays Well with Others

With Bobby Caldwell
 1996 Blue Condition 
 1999 Come Rain or Come Shine

With Frank Capp
 1982 Juggernaut Strikes Again! 
 1995 In a Hefti Bag
 1997 Play It Again Sam

With Rosemary Clooney
 1992 Girl Singer 
 2002 Out of This World

With Natalie Cole
 1991 Unforgettable... with Love 
 1993 Take a Look
 1999 Snowfall on the Sahara
 2008 Still Unforgettable

With Bob Florence
 1979 Live at Concerts by the Sea
 1981 Westlake
 1982 Soaring
 1992 Jewels - compilation

With Bill Holman
 1995 A View from the Side 
 1997 Brilliant Corners: The Music of Thelonious Monk
 2007 Hommage

With Quincy Jones
 1971 Smackwater Jack 
 1974 Body Heat
 1976 I Heard That!!
 1995 Q's Jook Joint
 1999 From Q with Love
 2000 Basie and Beyond (with Sammy Nestico)

With Phil Kelly & The Northwest Prevailing Winds
 2003 Convergence Zone
 2006 My Museum – Phil Kelly & The Southwest Santa Ana Winds
 2009 Ballet Of The Bouncing Beagles

With Seth MacFarlane
 2011 Music Is Better Than Words 
 2017 In Full Swing

With The Manhattan Transfer
 1977 Pastiche 
 1991 The Offbeat of Avenues
 1992 The Christmas Album

With Frank Mantooth
 1987 Per-Se-Vere 
 1995 Sophisticated Lady
 1999 Miracle

With Diane Schuur
 1986 Timeless 
 1993 Love Songs

With Tom Scott
 1973 Great Scott 
 1982 Desire
 1983 Target
 1991 Keep This Love Alive
 1992 Born Again
 1995 Night Creatures
 1999 Smokin' Section

With Keely Smith
 2000 Swing, Swing, Swing
 2001 Keely Sings Sinatra
 2002 Keely Swings Basie-Style with Strings

With Gary Urwin Jazz Orchestra
 2000 Perspectives
 2001 Living In The Moment [rel. 2003]
 2006 Kindred Spirits – Bill Watrous/Pete Christlieb/Gary Urwin Jazz Orchestra
 2014 A Beautiful Friendship – Bill Watrous/Pete Christlieb/Carl Saunders/Gary Urwin Jazz Orchestra

With Tom Waits
 1974 The Heart of Saturday Night
 1975 Nighthawks at the Diner [live]

With Anthony Wilson
 1997 Anthony Wilson
 1999 Adult Themes

With others
 1968 Sonny's Dream (Birth of the New Cool), Sonny Criss
 1970 Music from 'The Adventurers' , Ray Brown
 1972 Free Again, Gene Ammons
 1972 Sarah Vaughan with Michel Legrand, Sarah Vaughan
 1973 Corazón, Percy Faith
 1974 Dreamer, Bobby "Blue" Bland
 1974 Let's Love, Peggy Lee
 1975 High Energy, Freddie Hubbard
 1976 Can't Hide Love, Carmen McRae
 1976 Earl Klugh, Earl Klugh
 1977 Aja, Steely Dan
 1978 3-Way Mirror, Livingston Taylor
 1978 Frankie Valli...Is the Word, Frankie Valli
 1979 Donald Byrd and 125th Street N.Y.C., Donald Byrd
 1979 Palette, Alan Broadbent
 1979 Street of Dreams Bill Henderson
 1979 The Cat and the Hat, Ben Sidran
 1980 Growing Up in Hollywood Town, Lincoln Mayorga/Amanda McBroom
 1980 Night Song, Ahmad Jamal
 1981 Playin' It Straight, Jack Sheldon
 1982 Dawg Jazz/Dawg Grass, David Grisman
 1982 It's a Fact, Jeff Lorber
 1984 Then and Now, Joe Williams (with Mike Melvoin)
 1989 Sarabanda, Martin Taylor
 1991 Never Let Me Go, Toni Tennille
 1992 Sweet Simon, Conte Candoli
 1993 Forever, Michael Feinstein
 1993 Homage to Duke, Dave Grusin
 1993 Michel Plays Legrand, Michel Legrand
 1993 Rules of the Road, Anita O'Day
 1994 Masterpieces, The Singers Unlimited
 1994 Somebody Loves Me, Frank Strazzeri
 1998 Big Band Favorites of Sammy Nestico, Sammy Nestico
 1998 The Magic Band II, Howard Roberts
 1998 When I Look in Your Eyes, Diana Krall
 2001 Singin' and Swingin' , Joey DeFrancesco
 2002 A Jazz Musician's Christmas, Tom Kubis
 2002 The House I Live In, Tony Danza
 2002 Waves: The Bossa Nova Sessions, Eden Atwood
 2003 From Me to You: A Tribute to Lionel Hampton, Terry Gibbs
 2004 Jazz Standards, Stanley Clarke
 2005 Big Band, Kevin Mahogany
 2005 Let Me Off Uptown, Cheryl Bentyne
 2006 Back in Town, Matt Dusk
 2006 Round Trip, Marilyn Harris
 2007 The Lost Bill Holman Charts, Carl Saunders
 2009 At Last, Lynda Carter
 2012 Ellington Saxophone Encounters, Mark Masters
 2013 Made in California (1962–2012), The Beach Boys
 2013 To Be Loved, Michael Bublé
 2018 Sunlight, Chris Standring

References

External links

1945 births
Living people
Bebop saxophonists
West Coast jazz saxophonists
Hard bop saxophonists
Musicians from Los Angeles
21st-century saxophonists
The Capp-Pierce Juggernaut members
The Tonight Show Band members
Criss Cross Jazz artists